The open source BiSS interface (bidirectional/serial/synchronous) is based on a protocol which implements a real time interface. It enables a secure serial digital communication between controller, sensor and actuator. The BiSS protocol is designed in B mode and C mode (continuous mode). It is used in industrial applications which require transfer rates, safety, flexibility and a minimized implementation effort. The BiSS interface has roots in SSI and a simplified INTERBUS. The proprietary standards, Hiperface and EnDat are competing solutions.

Application 
 Position sensor system 
 Rotary encoder (absolute encoder)
 Linear position sensors (absolute encoder)
 Drive control (motor feedback) 
 Intelligent sensor system (smart sensors)
 Robotics

BiSS features 
 Open source
 Hardware compatible for SSI standard (synchronous serial interface)
 Cyclic reading of sensor data up to 64 bit per slave
 Transmission of status data, parameter, measured temperature value, configuration description, etc.
 Isochronal, real time capable data transmission
 bidirectional communication with two unidirectional lines
 Point-to-point or multi-slave networks
 Maximum user data rate, transmission data depending on driver and line of e.g. RS-422: 10 MHz, 1 km; LVDS: 100 Mbit/s
 Independent of the applied physical layer
 CRC secured communication (sensor data and control data secured separately)

Characteristics of BiSS C 
 Continuous sensor data transmission without interruption while using control data 
 Activation of actuators in bus during sensor data transmission
 Broader standardization through BiSS profiles, BiSS EDS (electronic data sheet), BiSS USER DATA, etc.
 Full compatibility of BiSS identifier (already defined in BiSS B)

History of BiSS in position sensor system 
 BiSS was showcased in 2002 by its founders iC-Haus GmbH
 Since BiSS B is not motor feedback compatible, BiSS C has been preferred in the market
 All patent cases against BiSS B were dropped in 2012: 
 EP 0790489B1: "Mode switching by frequency comparison"
 DE 19701310B4: "Mode switching as such"
 EP 1168120B1: "Block transmission of additional uncritical data"
 Multi-cycle data (MCD) are no longer utilized in the position sensor system with BiSS 
 Because BiSS utilizes the PHY of SSI [(RS-422)], it develops as the successor of the SSI interface in automation

References

External links 
 BiSS Interface Website
 BiSS C Protocol Description (English)

Communications protocols